L'empio punito is an opera by composer Alessandro Melani. Notably the first opera written on the subject of Don Juan, the work uses an Italian language libretto by Giovanni Filippo Apolloni and Filippo Acciaiuoli. The opera was commissioned by Marie Mancini for performance during Carnival of 1669. The work premiered at the Teatro di Palazzo Colonna in the historic Borgo district of Rome on 17 February 1669.

Roles
 Atamira 
 Ipomene 
 Delfa 
 Niceste  
 Proserpina 
 Bibi
 Atrace 
 Cloridoro
 Tidemo
 Acrimante
 Corimbo
 Telefo
 Demonio
 Caronte

Recordings
 DVD L'Empio Punito - Alessandro Ravasio, Michela Guarrera, Carlotta Colombo, Sabrina Cortese, Mauro Borgioni, Reate Festival Baroque Ensemble, Alessandro Quarta
 CD L'Empio Punito - Roberta Invernizzi, Raffaele Pe, Raffaella Milanesi, Giorgio Celenza, Alberto Allegrezza, Auser Musici, Carlo Ipata Glossa

References

Operas by Alessandro Melani
Italian-language operas
Operas
Works based on the Don Juan legend
1669 operas